Josef Novák (20 October 1900 – 1974) was a Czechoslovak footballer. He competed in the men's tournament at the 1924 Summer Olympics. On a club level, he played for SK Židenice.

References

External links
 

1900 births
1974 deaths
Czech footballers
Czechoslovak footballers
Czechoslovakia international footballers
Olympic footballers of Czechoslovakia
Footballers at the 1924 Summer Olympics
Sportspeople from Kladno
Association football forwards
FC Zbrojovka Brno players